St Thomas More Catholic School is a Roman Catholic secondary school with academy status in Blaydon, Tyne and Wear, England, providing teaching to 11- to 19-year-olds. It is a well-regarded and over-subscribed school, performing well both regionally and nationally. In its last OFSTED inspection (2013) it was described as "an outstanding and inclusive school" and found to be outstanding in all major areas assessed. The school converted to academy status on 1 February 2012.

School Organisation 
The current headteacher is Jonathan Parkinson, who took over after Michael Zarraga OBE retired in 2005. Its motto is "regis servus dei prius" which translates as, "I am the King's good servant, but God's first". This is a reference to St Thomas More, and his refusal to recognise Henry VIII as the Supreme Head of the Church following the King's split from the Vatican and Catholicism. There are ties to the two Catholic churches in Blaydon and Winlaton, St Joseph's and St Anne's.
 
The school is divided into four houses with every pupil placed into one.  Each of the houses are named after saints and are as follows:
St Bernadette
St Therese
St John Fisher
St Catherine Labouré

The houses provide pastoral care for each pupil, as well as being the focus of rivalry during inter-house competitions at the start of the year. During the inter-house competitions the houses compete against one another in activities such as football, basketball, chess and scrabble. During the final week of the Autumn Term, a quiz is held, with students representing their houses. Around 230 pupils enter the school every year, and are placed into eight classes, two in each house.

Catering at St Thomas More Catholic School is provided by an in-house company, Bistro@STM. There is a dining hall and separate booth on the yard serving snacks and light meals to the lower school, with an additional café area staffed by the catering department and sixth form students, this café is available for staff, sixth form and guests but not to members of the lower school (Key stage 3 and 4 students).

The school draws upon pupils from Year 13 to act as headboy and headgirl, with deputy positions. They plan and organise the prom at the end of each year, often at Beamish Hall. There are also House captains, usually one boy and one girl per house, also from Year 13.

Development 
In October 2011, a new building phase was begun, to house new class rooms which replaced a temporary block. The new building was attached to the main part of the school from the ICT department to the English department, housing science labs and humanities classrooms. The building was completed for the beginning of the 2013/2014 academic year.

During 2015 the school began an extensive construction project that included building a third floor on top of existing maths classrooms and science labs, as well as refurbishing both the interior and exterior of the maths classrooms and science labs and the interior of the textiles technology classrooms. The new floor meant that a larger maths classroom could be built, along with extensive facilities for learning support and psychology as well as a new general classroom and a designated training room. Also a new area was constructed as an addition to the playground that consisted of tables and benches for students to use, replacing area left by the temporary structure.

The school became an academy in August 2012, joining Thorp Academy to become two of the north east's leading schools. A multi-academy trust (The St Thomas More Partnership of Schools) was founded in 2014 with local primary schools, Sacred Heart in Byermoor, and St Matthew's in Prudhoe.

In April 2020 the previous St Thomas More Partnership of Schools multi-academy trust was dissolved so that St Thomas More could join and operate under the Bishop Wilkinson Catholic Education Trust which is based at Cardinal Hume Catholic School is Gateshead.

In 2019 it was announced that St Thomas More was one of the 194 schools in the UK that would be permitted to deliver the new T-level qualification To accommodate provision of the new qualifications St Thomas More added a third story to the school with three purpose built classrooms. There are further plans to renovate some of the existing Design Technology classrooms with facilities that are more suited to the T-levels on offer.

Extracurricular 
There are active Music and Drama departments, who run several groups and performances throughout the year. There are three main concerts each year, as well as a musical during the Spring term. Notably, the Chamber Choir performed at the Albert Hall in 2013. Pupils are awarded for their commitment after participating for three years in clubs, sports and the performing arts alike, through Colours Awards.

Notable former pupils 
Steve Mould, TV scientist and science blogger who discovered the Mould effect.
 Graham Onions, England and Durham cricketer
Nicky Deverdics Football League Footballer currently at Hartlepool United
Calum French Boxer, represented England at 2018 Commonwealth Games
Amber Rose Gill, Love Island 2019 Winner
Sebastian Payne (born 1989), journalist

See also
 St Thomas More Roman Catholic Academy, North Shields, similarly named school in North Shields.

References

External links

The School's OFSTED report

Secondary schools in Gateshead
Catholic secondary schools in the Diocese of Hexham and Newcastle
Academies in Gateshead